Hardest Pit in the Litter is the debut studio album by American rapper Big Pokey from Houston, Texas. It was released on May 18, 1999 via Chevis Entertainment. The album peaked at #72 on the US Billboard Top R&B/Hip-Hop Albums chart.

Track listing

Chart positions

References

External links

1999 debut albums
Big Pokey albums